Abbondio Marcelli (11 February 1932 – 7 December 2015) is an Italian rower. He competed at the 1956 Summer Olympics in Melbourne with the men's coxless four where they came fourth.

He died on 7 December 2015 in Bolzano.

References

External links 
 
 

1932 births
2015 deaths
Italian male rowers
Olympic rowers of Italy
Rowers at the 1956 Summer Olympics
People from Lierna
European Rowing Championships medalists
Sportspeople from the Province of Lecco